(Octavius) George Willey (12 January 1886 – 12 July 1952) was a Labour Party politician in England.  He was a Member of Parliament (MP) from 1945 until his death.

Early career
Willey was responsible for running Teesside's Air Raid Precautions service during the Second World War.  A trade unionist and campaigner, Willey first stood for Parliament at the 1923 general election in the Skipton constituency, but did not win a seat.  He was unsuccessful again in Skipton at the 1924 election, and also in Birmingham West at the 1931 and 1935 general elections.

Political career
Willey finally won a seat in the Labour landslide at the 1945 general election when he was elected for Cleveland; a seat which had only once before elected a Labour MP (in 1929).  Willey had been one of ten official candidates selected by the National Union of General and Municipal Workers (NUGMW), alongside Tom Williamson and others; all ten were elected.

He was re-elected in 1950 and 1951, and was awarded a CBE for political and public services. He died in office in 1952, aged 66.

References

External links 
 

1886 births
1952 deaths
GMB (trade union)-sponsored MPs
Labour Party (UK) MPs for English constituencies
UK MPs 1945–1950
UK MPs 1950–1951
UK MPs 1951–1955